David Adkins may refer to:

 David E. Adkins, New Mexico state legislator
 David Adkins (Kansas politician) (born 1961), Kansas state legislator
 Sinbad (comedian) (born David Adkins, 1956), American comedian